Saccopheronta is a genus of fly in the family Dolichopodidae. It is considered a synonym of Medetera by some authors, and a valid genus by others.

Species

 Saccopheronta aberrans (Wheeler, 1899)
 Saccopheronta abrupta (Van Duzee, 1919)
 Saccopheronta albitarsis (Van Duzee, 1931)
 Saccopheronta amplimanus (Van Duzee, 1931)
 Saccopheronta aperta Negrobov, Vanschuytbroeck & Grichanov, 1981
 Saccopheronta archboldi (Robinson, 1975)
 Saccopheronta arnaudi Negrobov, Vanschuytbroeck & Grichanov, 1981
 Saccopheronta bella (Van Duzee, 1929)
 Saccopheronta caffra (Curran, 1927)
 Saccopheronta dilatata (Becker, 1922)
 Saccopheronta excavata (Becker, 1922)
 Saccopheronta flabellifera (Becker, 1922)
 Saccopheronta flavides (Negrobov & Thuneberg, 1970)
 Saccopheronta fletcheri Grichanov, 1997
 Saccopheronta glabra Negrobov, Vanschuytbroeck & Grichanov, 1981
 Saccopheronta gomwa (Bickel, 1987)
 Saccopheronta hirsuticosta Parent, 1935
 Saccopheronta jamaicensis (Curran, 1928)
 Saccopheronta luzonensis (Bickel, 1987)
 Saccopheronta maai (Bickel, 1987)
 Saccopheronta metallina (Becker, 1922)
 Saccopheronta mindanensis (Bickel, 1987)
 Saccopheronta minor (Becker, 1922)
 Saccopheronta nigra Vanschuytbroeck, 1960
 Saccopheronta nigrimanus (Van Duzee, 1931)
 Saccopheronta nigritibia Negrobov, Vanschuytbroeck & Grichanov, 1981
 Saccopheronta nudipes Becker, 1914
 Saccopheronta occidentalis (Schiner, 1868)
 Saccopheronta ovata (Van Duzee, 1931)
 Saccopheronta pallidicornis (Van Duzee, 1929)
 Saccopheronta parvilamellata Parent, 1938
 Saccopheronta pedestris (Becker, 1922)
 Saccopheronta planipes (Van Duzee, 1919)
 Saccopheronta platychira (De Meijere, 1916)
 Saccopheronta pollinosa (Van Duzee, 1929)
 Saccopheronta pulchra Vanschuytbroeck, 1951
 Saccopheronta quinta Parent, 1936
 Saccopheronta scaura (Van Duzee, 1929)
 Saccopheronta setosa (Parent, 1931)
 Saccopheronta shatalkini Grichanov, 1997
 Saccopheronta spinulata (Parent, 1931)
 Saccopheronta steyskali (Robinson, 1975)
 Saccopheronta varipes (Van Duzee, 1929)
 Saccopheronta viridiventris (Van Duzee, 1933)
 Saccopheronta vockerothi (Bickel, 1985)
 Saccopheronta zicsiana Grichanov, 1997

References

Medeterinae
Dolichopodidae genera
Diptera of Europe
Taxa named by Theodor Becker